is a passenger railway station located in Tsurumi-ku, Yokohama, Kanagawa Prefecture, Japan, operated by the East Japan Railway Company (JR East).

Lines
Yakō Station is served by the Nambu Line.

Station layout
The station consists of one side platform (platform 1) and one island platform (platform 2/3) serving a total three tracks, connected by a footbridge. Platform 1 for down (Tachikawa-bound) services is on the west side of the station, alongside the station building, and the up (Kawasaki-bound) platforms 2 and 3 are connected by a footbridge. The station is staffed.

Stabling sidings lie adjacent to platform 3 on the east side of the station and also on the east side of the line south of the station.

Platforms 

Platform 3 is normally used only by trains to Kawasaki starting here during the morning and evening peak hours.

History 
Yakō Station opened as a station on the Nambu Railway on 9 March 1927.

The station building was burnt down during the bombing in 1945, and was later rebuilt.

With the privatization of Japanese National Railways (JNR) on 1 April 1987, the station came under the control of JR East.

Passenger statistics
In fiscal 2019, the station was used by an average of 19,449 passengers daily (boarding passengers only).

The passenger figures (boarding passengers only) for previous years are as shown below.

Surrounding area
 Yako District Center
Yako Post Office
Yako Shopping Street

See also
List of railway stations in Japan

References

External links

 JR East Station information 

Railway stations in Kanagawa Prefecture
Stations of East Japan Railway Company
Nambu Line
Railway stations in Japan opened in 1927
Railway stations in Yokohama